Steve Kenney (born December 26, 1955 in Wilmington, North Carolina) is a former professional American football player who played guard for seven seasons for the Philadelphia Eagles and the Detroit Lions.

NFL career

1981

During a 1981 NFL Wild Card playoff game against the New York Giants, Kenney suffered a broken ankle when teammate Stan Walters was blocking Lawrence Taylor. Taylor drive back Walters, who rolled up into Kenney's ankle in the turf of Veterans Stadium. Kenney was carried off the field by team trainers.

1955 births
Living people
American football offensive guards
Clemson Tigers football players
Philadelphia Eagles players
Detroit Lions players
Jesse O. Sanderson High School alumni